Çamlıpınar is a village in Anamur district of Mersin Province, Turkey. It is situated in the forests. The population of Çamlıpınar is 387  as of 2011.

References

Villages in Anamur District